Joseph Wagner (October 19, 1809October 27, 1896) was a German American immigrant, educator, and Democratic politician.  He was a member of the Wisconsin State Senate for four years and the State Assembly for six years, representing eastern Fond du Lac County.

Biography
Wagner was born on October 19, 1809, in Meckenbeuren, in what is now the state of Baden-Württemberg in southern Germany.  At the time of his birth, this area was part of the Kingdom of Württemberg in the Confederation of the Rhine.  He was raised and educated in Württemberg, and emigrated to the United States in 1832.  He settled first in Troy, New York, where he worked as a school teacher for several years.  He moved west to Mount Calvary, Wisconsin, in Fond du Lac County, in 1846.

He became involved in local politics shortly after his arrival in Wisconsin, and became a member of the Democratic Party of Wisconsin.  He was elected to the Fond du Lac County board of supervisors in 1848, and ran unsuccessfully for Wisconsin State Assembly in 1851.

He went on to win six terms in the Assembly, serving in the 1856, 1858, 1866, 1867, 1868, and 1871 sessions of the Legislature.  Although he represented the district in three different decades and under several different map configurations, his district always comprised his home town, Marshfield, and the four neighboring towns of Calumet, Forest, Taycheedah, and Empire.

In the 1871 redistricting, his district was dissolved as Fond du Lac went from six Assembly districts down to three.  But in the same redistricting, the county increased from one Senate district to two.  Wagner became the Democratic Party's nominee for Wisconsin State Senate in Fond du Lac's eastern Senate district (the 20th Senate district) and was elected in November, defeating Republican A. T. Germond.  He was re-elected in 1873 and retired from politics at the end of that term.

Throughout his political career, he also often served in local offices.  He was a member of the town board and county board for many years, and was superintendent of schools in his town.

Wagner died on October 27, 1896, at his home in Marshfield.

Electoral history

Wisconsin Assembly (1851)

| colspan="6" style="text-align:center;background-color: #e9e9e9;"| General Election, November 4, 1851

Wisconsin Senate (1871, 1873)

| colspan="6" style="text-align:center;background-color: #e9e9e9;"| General Election, November 7, 1871

| colspan="6" style="text-align:center;background-color: #e9e9e9;"| General Election, November 4, 1873

References

External links
 

|-

People from Bodenseekreis
People from Fond du Lac County, Wisconsin
People from Marshfield, Fond du Lac County, Wisconsin
German emigrants to the United States
Democratic Party Wisconsin state senators
Democratic Party members of the Wisconsin State Assembly
County supervisors in Wisconsin
School superintendents in Wisconsin
1809 births
1896 deaths
19th-century American politicians